The Museum of American Speed is a non-profit museum dedicated to preserving and displaying artifacts of American automotive history. The museum is located in Lincoln, Nebraska and is housed in a 135,000 square foot facility.

The museum has been in operation since 1992, and was established by Speedway Motors founder "Speedy" Bill Smith and his wife Joyce Smith, as a repository for a collection of automobilia amassed over 60 years.

Exhibits include racing vehicles dating from the 1920s to recent vintage Indy Cars, classic midget cars, Go-karts, motorized toys, antique and rare cars, automotive memorabilia, and Buck Rogers memorabilia, as well as autographed guitars.

References

External links
 Museum of American Speed - official site

Museums in Lincoln, Nebraska
Automobile museums in Nebraska